Leila McIntyre (December 20, 1882 – January 9, 1953) was an American actress and vaudeville performer.

Early life
Leila McIntyre was from Vermont, She was on stage from childhood.

Career

Leila McIntyre was a vaudeville performer, first as half of Linton & McIntyre, "The Chattering Chums", and finding fame as part of the Hyams & McIntyre comedy team with her husband, John Hyams. She appeared in several Broadway productions, including Mother Goose (1903), A Little of Everything (1904), York State Folks (1905), The Girl of My Dreams (1911) and The Dancing Duchess (1914). In a review of The Girl of My Dreams, the New York Times noted that McIntyre had "a pretty saucer-eyed innocent stare and quavering treble" suited to her ingenue role.

Leila McIntyre appeared in almost forty films, usually in small roles, including twice as Mary Todd Lincoln, in The Plainsman (1936) and in The Prisoner of Shark Island (1936). She was also seen in Hurricane (1929), On the Level (1930), Marriage on Approval (1933), Her Secret (1933), Private Worlds (1935), Murder in the Fleet, Mr. Cinderella (1936), Pick a Star (1937),  The Housekeeper's Daughter (1939) and Captain Eddie (1945). Her last film role was in The Hoodlum Saint (1946).

Personal life
Leila McIntyre married fellow actor John Hyams, in 1904. Their daughter, Leila Hyams (1905-1977), also became an actress. Leila McIntyre was widowed in 1940. She died in 1953, aged 70 years, in Los Angeles, California.

Filmography

References

External links

 
 Leila McIntyre's listing at IBDB.
 Leila McIntyre's gravesite, on Find a Grave.
 Portrait of John Hyams and Leila McIntyre, in the Macauley's Theatre Collection, University of Louisville Libraries Digital Collections.
 A postcard image of Leila McIntyre, from the Stuart A. Lassen Postcard Collection, Willard Library Digital Collections.

1882 births
1953 deaths
American actresses
Vaudeville performers